Montchauvet is the name of several communes in France:

 Montchauvet, Calvados
 Montchauvet, Yvelines